Aruni Yasodha Wijewardane is a Sri Lankan diplomat and the current Foreign Secretary of Sri Lanka. Previously she served in several senior positions in the Ministry of Foreign Affairs of Sri Lanka, as well as overseas.  From 2005 to 2008 she served as Ambassador of Sri Lanka to Austria and Permanent Representative to the International Organisations in Vienna. In addition to her career at the Ministry of Foreign Affairs, she also served as an international civil servant, as Director of the Secretariat of the Policy Making Organs of the International Atomic Energy Agency (IAEA) from 2013 to 2020.

Education 
Wijewardane holds an MPhil degree from the University of Cambridge, where she was a British Chevening Scholar. She also holds a master's degree from the University of Colombo and a bachelor's degree from the University of Western Australia. She speaks Sinhalese, English, French, and German. She attended secondary school at Ladies' College Colombo.

Career 
Wijewardane has served as a career diplomat with the Sri Lankan Ministry of Foreign Affairs since 1988.

In her early career, Wijewardane's diplomatic postings overseas included to the Permanent Mission of Sri Lanka to the United Nations, Geneva; Deputy Chief of Mission, Embassy of Sri Lanka, Philippines;  Deputy High Commissioner, Sri Lanka High Commission, Malaysia. She also held several positions in the Ministry of Foreign Affairs in Colombo.

From 2005 to 2008 Wijewardane served as Ambassador of Sri Lanka to Austria and Permanent Representative to the International Organisations, where she also held the position of Governor for Sri Lanka on the IAEA Board of Governors.

From 2011 to 2013, she was Director of the International Organizations and Nonproliferation Program at the James Martin Center for Nonproliferation Studies (CNS) in Monterey, California.

From 2013 to 2020, Wijewardane served as Secretary of the Policy Making Organs of International Atomic Energy Agency (IAEA).

On 20 May 2022, Wijewardane was appointed as the Foreign Secretary of Sri Lanka.

References 

Living people
Sinhalese civil servants
Sri Lankan diplomats
Sinhalese academics
Sri Lankan women academics
Foreign ministers of Sri Lanka
Ambassadors of Sri Lanka to Austria
High Commissioners of Sri Lanka to Malaysia
Sri Lankan women ambassadors
Alumni of the University of Cambridge
Year of birth missing (living people)